Edward F. Sweeney (April 26, 1949 – January 28, 2017) was an American football coach.  He served as the head football coach at Dickinson College from 1985 to 1992, Colgate University from 1993 to 1995, Frostburg State University from 1996 to 1999, and Mount Ida College from 2000 to 2007, compiling a career college football coaching record of 114–110–4.

Coaching career

Dickinson
Sweeney was the head football coach at Dickinson College in Carlisle, Pennsylvania for eight seasons, from 1985 until 1992.   His record at Dickinson was 56–23–3.  While at Dickinson in 1989, Sweeney was named the Kodak Division II Coach of the Year.

Colgate
Sweeney coached for three seasons at Colgate University from 1993 through the 1995 season, ending with an overall record of 6–26–1.  In his last season at Colgate, his team suffered a winless season with a record of 0–11.

Frostburg State
After coaching at Colgate for three seasons, Sweeney was named the tenth head coach at Frostburg State University in Frostburg, Maryland.  He held this position from 1996 to 1999 and led his teams to accomplishing an overall record of 30–11 (.732).  The 1996 team was the ECAC South Bowl Champion, while his 1999 squad won the Atlantic Central Football Conference Championship and also participated in the ECAC South Bowl.  For his efforts, Sweeney was the Atlantic Central Football Coach of the Year in 1999.

Mount Ida
Sweeney took over in 2000 as head football coach at Mount Ida College, a NCAA Division III school in Newton, Massachusetts. He was the second head football coach at Mount Ida, as the program began in 1999 under head coach John Papas.
He resigned in January 2008. Sweeney's record at Mount Ida was 22–51.

Stevenson
On May 21, 2010, Sweeney was named defensive coordinator at Stevenson University in Stevenson, Maryland. The Stevenson Mustangs began play in 2011.

Death
Sweeney died on January 28, 2017, at a hospital in Lewes, Delaware.  He had been suffering from multiple myeloma.

Head coaching record

College

References

External links
 Stevenson profile 

1949 births
2017 deaths
Boston University Terriers football coaches
LIU Post Pioneers football players
Colgate Raiders football coaches
Dickinson Red Devils football coaches
Frostburg State Bobcats football coaches
Mount Ida Mustangs football coaches
Stevenson Mustangs football coaches
Vermont Catamounts football coaches
High school football coaches in Massachusetts
High school football coaches in New York (state)
University of Vermont alumni
People from Bellerose, New York
Players of American football from New York (state)
Deaths from multiple myeloma